"The Waiting One" is a power ballad by American heavy metal band All That Remains. The song was released as the third and final single from the band's fifth studio album For We Are Many. No music video was produced for the song.

Reception
Loudwire reviewer Amy Sciaretto gave the song a positive review, calling it "deep, dark and daunting". Sciaretto said "the band isn’t afraid to show off a more sensitive side", citing the song's lyrics as sentimental.

Charts

Weekly charts

Year-end charts

References

2011 songs
2011 singles
All That Remains (band) songs
Razor & Tie singles
Songs written by Rob Graves
Songs written by Jason Costa
Songs written by Philip Labonte